Winning Colors may refer to:

Winning Colors (horse) (1985 - 2008), one of three fillies to win the Kentucky Derby
Winning Colors (novel), a science fiction novel published in 1995 by Elizabeth Moon